Deeann Hansel (born June 11, 1962) is an American former professional tennis player.

A native of Atlanta, Georgia, Hansel competed on the professional tour during the 1980s, reaching a career high singles ranking of 152 in the world.

Hansel qualified for her first grand slam main draw at the 1985 Australian Open and faced second seed Martina Navratilova in the first round, who won in straight sets and went on to win the title. She also qualified for the US Open in 1986 and as a doubles player featured in all four grand slam events.

Her best performances on the WTA Tour came at the Newport tournament, where she had an upset win over world number 21 Melissa Gurney in 1987, then in 1988 defeated Pam Casale in the first round.

ITF finals

Singles: 3 (0–3)

Doubles: 4 (1–3)

References

External links
 
 

1962 births
Living people
American female tennis players
Tennis players from Atlanta
21st-century American women